Blomia is a genus of flowering plants belonging to the family Sapindaceae.

Its native range is Southeastern Mexico to Central America.

Species:

Blomia prisca

References

Sapindaceae
Sapindaceae genera